Wolfgang Zeidler (2 September 1924 – 31 December 1987) was a German legal scholar and judge. He served as the 5th president of the Federal Constitutional Court of Germany from 1983 to 1987. Zeidler also served as president of the British-German-Jurists' Association.

References 

1924 births
1987 deaths
Jurists from Hamburg
Justices of the Federal Constitutional Court
Social Democratic Party of Germany politicians
Sozialistischer Deutscher Studentenbund members
Grand Crosses 1st class of the Order of Merit of the Federal Republic of Germany